Lafayette Sabine Foster (November 22, 1806 – September 19, 1880) was a nineteenth-century American politician and lawyer from Connecticut. He served in the United States Senate from 1855 to 1867 and was a judge on the Connecticut Supreme Court from 1870 to 1876.

Biography
Born in Franklin, Connecticut, Foster attended common schools as a child and graduated from Brown University in Providence, Rhode Island, in 1828. He taught school in Providence for some time and studied law back in Norwich, Connecticut. He took charge of an academy in Centerville, Maryland, where he was admitted to the Maryland bar in 1830, then returned to Norwich and was admitted to the federal bar in 1831.

Foster was editor of the Republican, a Whig newspaper out of Connecticut, and served in the Connecticut House of Representatives from 1839 to 1840, 1846 to 1848 and 1854, serving as Speaker of the House for three years. He was the Whig nominee for Governor of Connecticut in 1850 and 1851, but lost both elections. He served as mayor of Norwich, Connecticut, from 1851 to 1852 before being elected as an Oppositionist to the United States Senate in 1854, and reelected in 1860 as a Republican, serving from 1855 to 1867. There, he served as chairman of the Committee on Pensions from 1861 to 1867. His wife, Joanna Boylston Lanman, died on April 11, 1859.

Foster was elected President pro tempore of the Senate at the beginning of the 39th Congress in 1865, and held that title until the end of his term in 1867. Six weeks after he was elected, President Abraham Lincoln was assassinated by John Wilkes Booth. Two of Booth's accomplices also intended to assassinate Vice President Andrew Johnson as well as Secretary of State William H. Seward. Seward's assassin, Lewis Powell, struck but failed to kill, whereas Johnson's assassin, George Atzerodt, never acted. With Johnson's accession to the presidency, Foster became first in the United States presidential line of succession. Had Atzerodt followed through and successfully assassinated Johnson, Foster would have become acting president (in accordance with Article II, section 1 of the United States Constitution).

In 1866 Foster was elected as a Companion of the Third Class (i.e. an honorary member) of the Pennsylvania Commandery of the Military Order of the Loyal Legion of the United States - a military society of officers who served in the Union armed forces during the American Civil War and their descendants.

Foster sought reelection to a third term in 1866, but was defeated by Orris S. Ferry; his Senate career ended on March 3, 1867. He became a professor of law at Yale College in 1869 and returned to the Connecticut House of Representatives in 1870. He was once again elected Speaker of the House, but resigned to take a seat on the Connecticut Supreme Court. He was a Democratic candidate for the United States House of Representatives in 1874, but was unsuccessful and resigned from the court in 1876, retiring from public life. During his retirement he helped tutor young lawyers like Charles W. Comstock.  Foster died in Norwich, Connecticut, on September 19, 1880, and was interred there in Yantic Cemetery.

References

External links

|-

|-

|-

1806 births
1880 deaths
19th-century American judges
19th-century American politicians
Brown University alumni
Connecticut Oppositionists
Republican Party members of the Connecticut House of Representatives
Connecticut Whigs
Justices of the Connecticut Supreme Court
Mayors of Norwich, Connecticut
Opposition Party United States senators
People from Centreville, Maryland
People from Franklin, Connecticut
People of Connecticut in the American Civil War
Politicians from Norwich, Connecticut
Presidents pro tempore of the United States Senate
Republican Party United States senators from Connecticut
Speakers of the Connecticut House of Representatives
Union (American Civil War) political leaders